No Reserves. No Retreats. No Regrets. is an extended play from Overcome. Facedown Records released the album on January 18, 2013. This album was produced by Overcome.

Reception

Giving the EP a seven out of ten review at Cross Rhythms, Oscar Hyde writes, "this is a solid entry from veterans of the craft." Rob Shameless, rating the EP four and a half stars by HM Magazine, states, "If your a long-time fan of Overcome, you will love this record." Awarding the EP four stars for Indie Vision Music, Chris Bach says, "you get exactly what you’d expect."

Tracks

Credits
Overcome
 Jason Bowen - Bass
 Steven Cosand - Guitar
 Jason Stinson - Guitar, Vocals
 Jon Strunk - Drums
 Thomas Washington - Vocals
Production
 Andrew P. Glover - Engineer, Mastering, Mixing
 Dave Quiggle - Design, Layout
 Kiel Siler - Band Photo
 Ryan "Bart" Williams - Engineer

References

2013 albums
Facedown Records albums
Overcome (band) albums